Targum may mean:

any of the Aramaic translations of the Bible known as Targumim.    Most traditional Jews today focus all their learning of Aramaic texts on Targum Onkelos and on Targum Jonathan .
in medieval Jewish usage, the Aramaic language in general.
Targum (Aramaic dialect), sometimes used as a term for certain modern dialects of Judaeo-Aramaic, including that spoken by the Jews of Kurdistan.
The Daily Targum, official student newspaper of Rutgers University.
Targum Press, an Orthodox Jewish publishing house.